J. Mac Davis (born April 5, 1952) is an American lawyer, politician, and retired judge.  He is currently serving as a commissioner on the Wisconsin Ethics Commission, appointed to a five year term in 2016.  He was a Wisconsin Circuit Court judge in Waukesha County for 24 years, retiring in 2015.  Earlier in his career he represented Waukesha County in the Wisconsin State Senate as a Republican.

Biography

Davis graduated from University of Wisconsin–Madison in 1973, with honors, in economics. He then received his J.D. degree, cum laude, from University of Michigan Law School. Davis was admitted to the bar in Wisconsin in 1976.

Davis was elected to the Wisconsin State Senate in 1982, as a Republican, and was re-elected in 1986.  In the senate, he served as ranking senate minority member on the Joint Finance Committee.

In 1990, Davis was elected a Wisconsin Circuit Court judge for Waukesha County. He did not seek re-election in 1996, but unsuccessfully ran for congress. He was elected judge again in 1997, and re-elected in 2003 and 2009.  He served as chief judge of the 3rd Judicial District, by appointment of the Wisconsin Supreme Court, from 2007 to 2013.  He retired from his judgeship on July 31, 2015.

In September 2008, Judge Davis was nominated by U.S. President George W. Bush to the United States District Court for the Western District of Wisconsin, to replace Judge John C. Shabaz, who had stated his intention to retire. The United States Senate did not take up his confirmation and the nomination expired four months later at the end of Bush's presidency.

He was appointed by Governor Scott Walker to the newly created Wisconsin Ethics Commission, to a five year term commencing July 1, 2016.

References

External links
 Wisconsin Ethics Commission
 Mac Davis at Ballotpedia

 

 

 

1952 births
Living people
Politicians from Waukesha, Wisconsin
University of Wisconsin–Madison College of Letters and Science alumni
University of Michigan Law School alumni
Wisconsin lawyers
Wisconsin state court judges
Republican Party Wisconsin state senators